The 2012 Valencia Open 500 was a men's tennis tournament played on indoor hard courts. It was the 18th edition of the Valencia Open, and part of the 500 Series of the 2012 ATP World Tour. It was held at the Ciutat de les Arts i les Ciències in Valencia, Spain, from 20 October through 28 October 2012. This was the last tournament before the retirement from tennis of Juan Carlos Ferrero. First-seeded David Ferrer won the singles title.

Singles main-draw entrants

Seeds

 Seeds are based on the rankings of October 15, 2012

Other entrants
The following players received wildcards into the singles main draw:
  Juan Carlos Ferrero
  Lleyton Hewitt
  Javier Martí

The following players received entry from the qualifying draw:
  Ivan Dodig
  Jan Hájek
  Rajeev Ram
  Olivier Rochus

Withdrawals
  Juan Ignacio Chela
  Santiago Giraldo
  Tommy Haas
  Gaël Monfils
  David Nalbandian

Retirements
  Janko Tipsarević (right shoulder injury)
  Jo-Wilfried Tsonga (back injury)

Doubles main-draw entrants

Seeds

 Rankings are as of October 15, 2012

Other entrants
The following pairs received wildcards into the doubles main draw:
  Roberto Bautista Agut /  Daniel Gimeno Traver
  David Ferrer /  Juan Carlos Ferrero

Finals

Singles

 David Ferrer defeated  Alexandr Dolgopolov, 6–1, 3–6, 6–4

Doubles

 Alexander Peya /  Bruno Soares defeated  David Marrero /  Fernando Verdasco, 6–3, 6–2

References

External links
Official website